Catherine "Cathy" Mitton is a former para table tennis player who represented Great Britain. She has won team events with Sara Head and Lynne Riding.

References

Living people
English female table tennis players
Paralympic table tennis players of Great Britain
Medalists at the 2000 Summer Paralympics
Medalists at the 2004 Summer Paralympics
Table tennis players at the 2000 Summer Paralympics
Table tennis players at the 2004 Summer Paralympics
Table tennis players at the 2008 Summer Paralympics
Year of birth missing (living people)
Paralympic medalists in table tennis
Paralympic bronze medalists for Great Britain
Commonwealth Games bronze medallists for England
Commonwealth Games medallists in table tennis
Table tennis players at the 2002 Commonwealth Games
Table tennis players at the 2006 Commonwealth Games
Medallists at the 2002 Commonwealth Games
Medallists at the 2006 Commonwealth Games